Terry Dean (born January 11, 1971) is a former American and Canadian football quarterback in the Canadian Football League (CFL), Arena Football League (AFL) and World League of American Football (WLAF). He played college football at Florida. Dean played for the Winnipeg Blue Bombers of the CFL, Florida Bobcats of the AFL and the Rhein Fire of the WLAF.

References

1971 births
Living people
American football quarterbacks
American players of Canadian football
Canadian football quarterbacks
Florida Gators football players
Florida Bobcats players
Rhein Fire players
Winnipeg Blue Bombers players
Sportspeople from Naples, Florida
Players of American football from Florida